Begonia anodifolia is a species of plant in the family Begoniaceae and is native to Mexico.

References 

anodifolia
Flora of Mexico